The Huntington Center is a skyscraper on Capitol Square in downtown Columbus, Ohio. It is the fourth tallest building in Columbus, and the tallest constructed in the 1980s. It was largely completed in 1984, though finishing touches were still being added into 1985. The building opened on May 16, 1985.

The building is part of a complex by the same name, which also contains Huntington Plaza, DoubleTree Hotel Guest Suites Columbus, and the Huntington National Bank Building.

The Huntington Center replaced the Neil House, a hotel that operated on the site from 1842 to 1980.

See also
List of tallest buildings in Columbus

References

Emporis
Skyscraperpage

External links
 

Skyscraper office buildings in Columbus, Ohio
Buildings and structures completed in 1985
Huntington Bancshares
Skyscrapers in Columbus, Ohio
Skyscraper hotels in Ohio
Skidmore, Owings & Merrill buildings
Buildings in downtown Columbus, Ohio
Bank buildings in Columbus, Ohio
Hotels in Columbus, Ohio
High Street (Columbus, Ohio)